This article displays the rosters for the participating teams at the 2013 FIBA Africa Championship.

Group A

Algeria
The roster was announced on 19 August.

|}
| valign="top" |
Head coach

Legend
Club – describes lastclub before the tournament
Age – describes ageon 20 August 2013
|}

Egypt
The roster was announced on 14 August.

|}
| valign="top" |
Head coach

Legend
Club – describes lastclub before the tournament
Age – describes ageon 20 August 2013
|}

Ivory Coast
The roster was announced on 17 August.

|}
| valign="top" |
Head coach

Legend
Club – describes lastclub before the tournament
Age – describes ageon 20 August 2013
|}

Senegal
The roster was announced on 18 August.

|}
| valign="top" |
Head coach

Legend
Club – describes lastclub before the tournament
Age – describes ageon 20 August 2013
|}

Group B

Burkina Faso

|}
| valign="top" |
Head coach

Legend
Club – describes lastclub before the tournament
Age – describes ageon 20 August 2013
|}

Morocco

|}
| valign="top" |
Head coach

Legend
Club – describes lastclub before the tournament
Age – describes ageon 20 August 2013
|}

Rwanda

|}
| valign="top" |
Head coach

Legend
Club – describes lastclub before the tournament
Age – describes ageon 20 August 2013
|}

Tunisia

|}
| valign="top" |
Head coach

Legend
Club – describes lastclub before the tournament
Age – describes ageon 20 August 2013
|}

Group C

Angola
The roster was announced on 16 August.

|}
| valign="top" |
 Head coach

 Assistant coaches

Legend
Club – describes lastclub before the tournament
Age – describes ageon 20 August 2013
|}

Cape Verde
The roster was announced on 17 August.

|}
| valign="top" |
Head coach

Assistant coach

Fitness coach

Physiotherapist

Legend
Club – describes lastclub before the tournament
Age – describes ageon 20 August 2013
|}

Central African Republic
The roster was announced on 19 August.

|}
| valign="top" |
Head coach

Legend
Club – describes lastclub before the tournament
Age – describes ageon 20 August 2013
|}

Mozambique

|}
| valign="top" |
Head coach

Legend
Club – describes lastclub before the tournament
Age – describes ageon 20 August 2013
|}

Group D

Cameroon

|}
| valign="top" |
Head coach

Legend
Club – describes lastclub before the tournament
Age – describes ageon 20 August 2013
|}

Congo

|}
| valign="top" |
Head coach

Assistant coach

Legend
Club – describes lastclub before the tournament
Age – describes ageon 20 August 2013
|}

Mali

|}
| valign="top" |
Head coach

Legend
Club – describes lastclub before the tournament
Age – describes ageon 20 August 2013
|}

Nigeria
The roster was announced on 18 August.

|}
| valign="top" |
Head coach

 Assistant coaches

 Team doctor

 Physioterapist

Legend
Club – describes lastclub before the tournament
Age – describes ageon 20 August 2013
|}

See also
 2013 FIBA Africa Clubs Champions Cup squads

References

External links
Official website

2013 squads
squads